Sardsar-e Shahi Jan (also Romanized as Sardsar-e Shāhī Jān; also known as Shāhī Jān and Shāh Jān) is a village in Pir Kuh Rural District, Deylaman District, Siahkal County, Gilan Province, Iran. At the 2006 census, its population was 58, in 15 families.

References 

Populated places in Siahkal County